"Servant of God" is a title used in the Catholic Church to indicate that an individual is on the first step toward possible canonization as a saint.

Terminology
The expression "servant of God" appears nine times in the Bible, the first five in the Old Testament, the last four in the New. ,
).
refers to Joshua as ‘eḇeḏ Yahweh (עֶ֣בֶד יְהוָ֑ה).

Following usage conventions established in the King James Bible, the word "servant" is never capitalized or used as a title of nobility. ("The servant is not greater than his lord.")

Catholic Church
"Servant of God" is an expression used for a member of the Catholic Church whose life and works are being investigated in consideration for official recognition by the Pope and the Catholic Church as a saint in Heaven. The term "Servant of God" should not be confused with Servus Servorum Dei (Servant of the Servants of God), one of the titles of the Pope.

The term Servant of God is used in the first of the four steps in the canonization process. The next step is being declared Venerable, upon a decree of heroism or martyrdom by the honored. That is followed by beatification, with the title of Blessed. After the confirmation of miracles resulting from the intercession of the honored, the final step is canonization, where the honored would receive the title of Saint. The process for canonization is under the jurisdiction of the Congregation for the Causes of Saints.

Servant of God is not considered a canonical title in a strict sense by the Catholic Church (as for instance Venerable or Blessed are), but only a technical term used in the process of canonization. Hence, any of the faithful can be named a "Servant of God" in a larger frame of meaning.

See also 

 List of Servants of God
Candidates for sainthood

Explanatory notes

References

External links 
 

Ecclesiastical titles
 
Sainthood
Canonization